"Imagínate" (English: Imagine) is a song by Puerto Rican reggaeton duo Wisin & Yandel. It is the first single from the album's re-release of La Revolución titled La Revolución: Evolution, released on November 2, 2009. The song features American singer T-Pain. The song failed in any Billboard component chart as it garnered little airplay.

Music video 
The music video was filmed movie-style on a graveyard in Los Angeles in October 2009, in conjunction with the music video for "Te Siento", including guest appearances of actors Amaury Nolasco, Paula Garcés, Wilmer Valderrama and fellow Reggaeton singer Franco "El Gorila".
 
The music video shows a dramatic story of a love triangle between two men and a woman, played by Amaury, Paula and Wilmer, arriving to suffer tragic consequences. Wisin & Yandel are part of the drama as friends of one of the protagonists. Through the sequence of the video, it shows T-Pain into a car, while it rains. It was directed by Jessy Terrero, premiered on November 2, 2009.

References

External links 
"Imagínate" (music video)
Official website
 

2009 songs
Wisin & Yandel songs
T-Pain songs
Songs written by T-Pain
Songs written by Wisin
Songs written by Yandel
Songs written by Nesty (producer)